A by-election for the seat of Canterbury in the New South Wales Legislative Assembly was held on 6 January 1871 because of the resignation of Montagu Stephen due to ill health.

Dates

Results

Montagu Stephen resigned.

See also
Electoral results for the district of Canterbury
List of New South Wales state by-elections

References

1871 elections in Australia
New South Wales state by-elections
1870s in New South Wales